Ritu Raj Awasthi (born 3 July 1960) is an Indian Judge. He is currently serving as the Chairperson of 22nd Law Commission of India. He was Chief Justice of Karnataka High Court from 11 October 2021 to 2 July 2022. He was a Judge of Allahabad High Court from 13 April 2009 to 10 October 2021. Ritu Raj Awasthi was appointed as Law Commission chairperson on 07 November 2022.

Career
Born on 3 July 1960, he was graduated in the year 1980. He was enrolled as an Advocate on 1 February 1987. He has practiced in civil service and educational matters. He was elevated as an Additional Judge of Allahabad High Court on 13 April 2009 and took oath as Permanent Judge on 24 December 2010. He was elevated as Chief Justice of Karnataka High Court on 9 October 2021 and took oath on 11 October 2021. He retired on 2nd July 2022. On 9 November 2022, he was appointed as the Chairperson of the 22nd Law Commission of India.

References

 

Indian judges
1960 births
Living people